The Lord of the G-Strings: The Femaleship of the String is a 2003 American made for cable erotic film written and directed by Terry M. West. It is based on the novel The Lord of the Rings by J. R. R. Tolkien.

Background
This film is produced by the production company E.I. Independent Cinema. It was broadcast several times in Summer 2003 at fixed times and on demand on the premium channel Showtime.

External links
 
 

2003 television films
2003 films
American erotic films
Films based on The Lord of the Rings
2000s American films
2000s British films
Middle-earth parodies
2000s parody films
American parody films